Kepler-68 is a Sun-like main sequence star. It is known to have at least three planets orbiting around it. The outermost planet has a mass similar to Jupiter but orbits within the habitable zone.

High resolution imaging observations of Kepler-68 carried out with the lucky imaging instrument AstraLux on the 2.2m telescope at Calar Alto Observatory detected a wide companion candidate approximately 11 arcseconds away. Comparing these observations to the 2MASS positions shows that the companions proper motion is consistent with it being bound to the Kepler-68 system, but further observations are needed to confirm this conclusion. Eleven arcseconds at the distance of Kepler-68 leads to a sky projected separation of approximately 1600 Astronomical units. A circular orbit at that distance would have a period of roughly 50,000 years.

Planetary system

Currently, three planets have been discovered to orbit around Kepler-68. Two of the innermost planets were discovered by the planetary transit method. Follow-up Doppler measurements helped to determine the mass of Kepler-68b and helped to discover Kepler-68d. There is an additional signal present in the radial velocity measurements indicating another body in the system at a period of greater than 10 years. The mass of this object is unknown and it could be either another planet or a stellar companion.

References

Cygnus (constellation)
Planetary transit variables
246
Planetary systems with three confirmed planets
G-type main-sequence stars
BD+48 2893
J19240775+4902249